The World Group Play-offs were the main play-offs of 2010 Davis Cup. Winners advanced to the World Group, and loser were relegated in the Zonal Regions I.

Teams
Bold indicates team has qualified for the 2012 Davis Cup World Group.

 From World Group

 From Americas Group I

 From Asia/Oceania Group I

 From Europe/Africa Group I

Results

Seeded teams
 
 
 
 
 
 
 
 

Unseeded teams

 
 
 
 
 
  
 
 

Playoff results

Colombia vs. United States

Israel vs. Austria

Germany vs. South Africa

Sweden vs. Italy

India vs. Brazil

Australia vs. Belgium

Rain stopped play on the third day: only 51 minutes of play were held in rubber 4 in which Peter Luczak and Olivier Rochus won 4 games each in the first set. The remainder of Rubber 4 and Rubber 5 continued on 20 September 2010.

Kazakhstan vs. Switzerland

Romania vs. Ecuador

References

World Group Play-offs